The 2019 Netball Superleague season was the fourteenth season of the Netball Superleague, the elite domestic netball competition in the United Kingdom. The season commenced on 5 January 2019.

Manchester Thunder were the champions and defeated Wasps Netball in the Grand Final at the Copper Box Arena. The Thunder's victory ended Wasps' back-to-back run of titles and was their third championship in the competition.

Overview

Teams
At the end of the previous season, England Netball announced the withdrawal of Team Northumbria from the competition. The organisation revealed a capital-based team (the London Pulse) would take their place, thereby ensuring the league remained at 10 teams.

Format
The format is the same as the previous season, with a double round-robin structure utilised. The top four teams qualify for the semi-finals, with the winners of these matches meeting in the Grand Final.

Regular season
 The full regular season fixture and results can be found here.

Round 1

Round 2

Round 3

Round 4

Round 5

 Severn Stars were deducted three points by league officials after breaching regulation 1.1.3.1 of the competition rules, which forbid two or more foreign players from operating in the same third during a match.

Round 6

Round 7

Round 8

Round 9

Round 10

Round 11

Round 12

Round 13

Round 14

Round 15

Round 16

Round 17

Round 18

Ladder

Finals series

Semi-final

Semi-final

Third-place playoff

Grand Final

References

External links
 Official Website

 
2019
2019 in English netball
2019 in Welsh women's sport
2019 in Scottish women's sport